Thought: A Journal of Philosophy is a quarterly peer-reviewed academic journal published by the Philosophy Documentation Center in cooperation with the Thought Trust.  The journal covers logic, philosophy of mathematics, philosophy of mind, epistemology, philosophy of language, and metaphysics.  The editors-in-chief are Crispin Wright (Universities of Stirling and New York), John Divers (University of Leeds), and Kathrin Glüer-Pagin (Stockholm University). From 2012-2021 this journal was published by Wiley-Blackwell.

Abstracting and indexing 
Thought: A Journal of Philosophy is abstracted and indexed in Academic OneFile, Arts & Humanities Citation Index, The Philosopher's Index, PhilPapers, and Scopus.

External links 
 

English-language journals
Epistemology journals
Logic journals
Metaphysics literature
Philosophy of language literature
Philosophy of mind journals
Publications established in 2012
Wiley-Blackwell academic journals